Bisco industries was founded in Chicago, Illinois by Glen Ceiley on March 15, 1973. At the time, Glen F. Ceiley was the sole employee of Bisco industries and assumed the following roles: purchasing agent, salesperson, shipper, receiver and bookkeeper. Bisco industries is a supplier and distributor of fasteners, hardware, and electronic components. Bisco industries serves customers in many industries including electronics, aerospace and fabrication. Bisco industries has 48 locations throughout the United States and Canada which employ over 380 employees.

In March 2010, EACO corporation completed the acquisition of Bisco industries, Inc. Prior to the acquisition, Glen Ceiley was the sole shareholder of Bisco industries and also controlled the majority of common stock issued by EACO. Bisco industries performs day-to-day operations for EACO corporation which includes administration and accounting services.

According to Global Purchasing, Bisco industries is ranked 20th in the Top 50 Electronics Distributors of 2015 with $136.8 million in sales revenue.  In 2020 Bisco Industries was ranked 17th in the Top 50 Electronics Distributors by Source Today. 

bisco industries launched a blog series called What is it? Wednesday.  The blog’s content focuses on educating readers on common electronic components and fasteners. The blogs contain information such as product descriptions, use applications, and technical resources for various products.

References

External links
 

Companies based in Anaheim, California
Manufacturing companies established in 1973
1973 establishments in Illinois
Manufacturing companies of the United States